Véronique Dasen (born 1957) is a Swiss archaeologist and Professor in Classical Archaeology and Art History at the University of Fribourg. Her research is led in a multidisciplinary and anthropological perspective. Her research interests range from ancient iconography and material culture, the history of the body, of medicine and magical practices to gender studies, history of childhood, and ludic culture (games and divination, games and love, passage rites).

Career
Dasen received her PhD in 1989 from the University of Oxford with a thesis titled "Dwarfs in Ancient Egypt and Greece", which she published as a monograph in 1993.

Since 2008, she has worked as the Professor in Classical Archaeology and Art History at the University of Fribourg. She was the fifth woman to receive her habilitation from the Faculty of Humanities at the University of Fribourg in 2000. In 2016, she gave a series of lectures at the École pratique des hautes études on 'Magic, divination, and the history of the body'. In 2017, she was a visiting lecturer at the Pantheon-Sorbonne University. Also in 2017 she was involved in the successful funding application to the European Research Council for a €2.4million grant for a five-year project titled 'Locus Ludi: The Cultural Fabric of Play and Games in Classical Antiquity'.

Dasen is the Chair of the panel 'SHS-4 Social sciences and humanities' for the Fonds de la Recherche Scientifique.

Publications
2018. "Amulets, the Body and Personal Agency", in Parker, A. and McKie, S. (eds) Material Approaches to Roman Magic: Occult Objects and Supernatural Substances (TRAC Themes in Roman Archaeology 2). Oxford, Oxbow.
2015. "Probaskania: Amulets and Magic in Antiquity", in Boschung, D. and Bremmer, J. The Materiality of Magic (Mophomata 20). Paderborn, Wilhelm Fink.
2015. Le sourire d'Omphale. Maternité et petite enfance dans l'Antiquité. Rennes.
2014. With Spieser, J-M., Les savoirs magiques et leur transmission de l’Antiquité à la Renaissance. Florence
2010. With Späth, T. Children, Memory, and Family Identity in Roman Culture. Oxford 2010.
2008. With King, H. La médecine dans l’Antiquité grecque et romaine. Lausanne
2005. Jumeaux, jumelles dans l’Antiquité grecque et romaine. Kilchberg.
1993. Dwarfs in Ancient Egypt and Greece'' (Oxford Monographs on Classical Archaeology). Oxford, Clarendon Press.

References

Living people
1957 births
Women classical scholars
Academic staff of the University of Fribourg
Alumni of the University of Oxford
Swiss archaeologists
Swiss classical scholars
European Research Council grantees
Swiss women archaeologists